Writing with Intent: Essays, Reviews, Personal Prose—1983-2005 (2006) is a collection of essays by the Canadian author Margaret Atwood. The book includes accounts of the author's experiences as a young woman becoming a writer; many reviews of films and books; obituaries, and a long essay criticizing the Iraq War.

Books by Margaret Atwood
2006 non-fiction books
Canadian non-fiction books
Carroll & Graf books